The Zombies franchise consisted of three musical adventure-comedy films directed by Paul Hoen, two Disney Channel Original Movies and one film that premiered on Disney+ before airing on Disney Channel. Written by David Light and Joseph Raso, the series began with Zombies (2018) and ended with Zombies 3 (2022). The franchise follows Zed, a zombie, and Addison, a human cheerleader, as they fall in love and fight for acceptance in monsters.

The franchise stars Milo Manheim as Zed and Meg Donnelly as Addison. Zombies premiered on Disney Channel on February 16, 2018, Zombies 2 premiered on Disney Channel on February 14, 2020, and Zombies 3 premiered on Disney+ on July 15, 2022 before airing on Disney Channel on August 12, 2022. It was originally meant to be television series titled Zombies and Cheerleaders which never aired and re-developed in Zombies.

Film series

Zombies (2018)

Students from Zombietown transfer to Seabrook High, a school whose suburban town is filled with uniformity, traditions and pep rallies. When Zombie football player Zed and human cheerleader Addison fall in love, chaos ensues, and the two must lead their groups' to coexistence with each other.

In May 2017, Zombies was reported to have begun production. Its trailer was released on January 5, 2018. Zombies was released on February 16, 2018. The film watched by 2.6 million viewers on its premiere night.

Zombies 2 (2020)

Zed and Addison have continued to steer both their school and community toward unity. However, the arrival of the werewolves complicates their relationship.

In early 2019, a sequel to Zombies was in production, with the actors, director and writer returning. Pearce Joza, Chandler Kinney, and Ariel Martin joined the cast with Kylee Russell, Trevor Tordjman, Carla Jeffery, James Godfrey, and Kingston Foster reprising their roles from the first film. The film was released on February 14, 2020, watched by 2.5 million viewers and received positive reviews.

Zombies 3 (2022)

Seabrook's humans, zombies, and werewolves coexist. Being this is senior year at Seabrook's high school for Zed and Addison, the former is looking to become the first zombie admitted into higher education with a football scholarship, and the latter is in the final stages of preparing to open a new cheerleading pavilion and host a competition consisting of cheer teams from around the world. Meanwhile, aliens arrive at Seabrook, whose leaders A-Spen, A-Li, and A-Lan initially claiming they are interested in spectating the cheer competition Addison organized.

In late-March 2021, Disney Channel green-lit Zombies 3 with Meg Donnelly and Milo Manheim returning to star. Paul Hoen was also reported to be returning as director as well as David Light and Joseph Raso as writers. Light, Raso and Suzanne Farwell will executive produce. On May 19, 2021, Matt Cornett, Kyra Tantao and Terry Hu joined the cast as A-Lan, A-Li and A-Spen. Chandler Kinney, Pearce Joza, Ariel Martin, Trevor Tordjman, Carla Jeffery, Kylee Russell, James Godfrey and Kingston Foster were reported to be reprising their roles. Production began on May 31, 2021. In May 2022, it was announced that RuPaul would be voicing the mothership. It was also announced that the film would premiere on July 15, 2022 on Disney+ as an original film, with an extended version premiering on Disney Channel on August 12.

Television series

Zombies: Addison's Moonstone Mystery / Zombies: Addison's Monster Mystery
On October 16, 2020, Zombies: Addison's Moonstone Mystery, a series of animated shorts, began airing on Disney Channel. The story revolves around Addison (Meg Donnelly) who journeys through a mysterious dreamscape to find her true identity. 
The series was renewed for a second season with its new title, Addison’s Monster Mystery, which was released in October 2021.

Zombies: The Re-animated Series
In June 2022, during the Annecy Film Festival, it was reported that an animated series, titled Zombies: The Re-animated Series, is in being developed by Disney Television Animation for Disney+ and Disney Channel. Descendants: Wicked World creator and director Aliki Theofilopoulos and Amphibia story editor Jack Ferriolo will serve as creators and showrunners. The duo will also executive-produce the series alongside Gary Marsh and the films' writers Joseph Russo and David Light.

Crew

Cast

Reception
Reception for the films have generally been positive. On Rotten Tomatoes, Zombies 2 has an approval rating of 100% based on 5 reviews, with an average score of 7.4/10, while Zombies 3 has an approval rating of 80% based on 5 reviews, with an average score of 7.8/10.

References

Disney Channel Original Movie films
Films shot in Toronto
Comedy film franchises
Film series introduced in 2018